Halloween 4: The Return of Michael Myers  is a 1988 American slasher film directed by Dwight H. Little, written by Alan B. McElroy, and starring Donald Pleasence, Ellie Cornell, and Danielle Harris in her film debut.

As its title suggests, the film attempted to bring back Michael Myers after his absence in Halloween III: Season of the Witch (1982). Initially, John Carpenter and co-producer Debra Hill intended to create an anthology series, with only the first two films being connected. Halloween 4 was originally intended to be a ghost story, but after the poor reception of Halloween III, the idea was abandoned. 

Released in the United States on October 21, 1988, Halloween 4 grossed $17.8 million domestically on a budget of $5 million, and received mostly negative reviews from critics. However, the film, much like the series in general, has developed a strong cult following since its release. The film begins the "Thorn Trilogy" story arc which would be continued in Halloween 5: The Revenge of Michael Myers (1989) and Halloween: The Curse of Michael Myers (1995).

Plot
On October 30, 1988, Michael Myers, who has been comatose for ten years since the explosion at Haddonfield Memorial Hospital, is transferred to Smith's Grove Sanitarium by ambulance from his current residence in the Ridgemont Federal Sanitarium. Upon hearing that he has a niece, Michael awakens and kills the ambulance personnel, causing the vehicle to crash into a river. Michael escapes and makes his way to Haddonfield. Michael's former psychiatrist, Samuel Loomis, learns of Michael's escape and gives chase. He follows Michael to a gas station and eatery, where Michael has killed a mechanic for his clothes, along with a female clerk. Michael escapes in a tow truck and causes the gas pumps to explode in the process, destroying Loomis's car and disabling the phone lines. Loomis catches a ride to Haddonfield to continue pursuing Michael.

Meanwhile, Jamie Lloyd, Laurie Strode's daughter and Michael's niece, is living in Haddonfield with her foster family, Richard and Darlene Carruthers, and their teenage daughter, Rachel. Jamie has nightmares about Michael; though she knows of her uncle, she does not realize he is the figure in said nightmares. On Halloween night, Richard and Darlene go to a party and leave Rachel to babysit, forcing her to cancel a date with her boyfriend Brady. After school, Rachel takes Jamie to buy ice cream and a Halloween costume. Michael arrives in Haddonfield and steals a mask from the same store that Jamie and Rachel are visiting; he almost attacks the former but flees when she screams.

That night, as Rachel takes Jamie trick-or-treating, Michael breaks into the house and finds photos of Laurie in Jamie's bedroom. Loomis arrives in Haddonfield and warns the new Sheriff Ben Meeker that Michael has returned. Michael heads to the power station and kills a worker by throwing him into a transformer, plunging the town into darkness. Michael then attacks the police station, killing every officer inside. A lynch mob is formed by the townspeople to kill Michael. Rachel discovers Brady cheating on her with Sheriff Meeker's daughter Kelly, and loses track of Jamie. After being chased by Michael, Rachel finds Jamie.

Sheriff Meeker and Loomis arrive and take the girls to the sheriff's house, where Brady is with Kelly, along with a deputy. They barricade the house, and Loomis departs to look for Michael. Brady tries to talk to Rachel, but she refuses to speak with him. Michael sneaks into the house and kills the deputy and Kelly. Rachel and Jamie flee to the attic while Brady stays to fend off Michael, and is killed when Michael snaps his neck. The girls climb through a window onto the roof and Jamie is lowered down safely, but Michael attacks Rachel and knocks her off the roof, rendering her unconscious.

Pursued by Michael, Jamie runs and finds Loomis. They take shelter in the school, but Michael appears and throws Loomis through a glass door, then chases Jamie through the building. Jamie trips and falls down a flight of stairs. Rachel reappears and subdues Michael with a fire extinguisher, and he escapes. The lynch mob arrives, and four of the men agree to drive the girls to the next town. Along the way, they meet up with the state police en route to Haddonfield. Michael, who hid underneath the truck, climbs aboard and kills the four men. Rachel takes the wheel, throws Michael off the truck and then rams into him, casting him into a ditch near an abandoned mine. Sheriff Meeker, Loomis, the remaining lynch mob, and the state police arrive. Jamie approaches Michael and touches his hand, and he rises. Meeker, the state police, and the lynch mob shoot Michael until he falls down into the mine.

Loomis and Meeker take Jamie and Rachel back home. As Darlene goes upstairs to run a bath for Jamie, she is suddenly attacked. When Loomis investigates, he finds an emotionless Jamie holding a pair of bloody scissors and wearing a clown costume and mask at the top of the stairs, reminiscent of Michael when he killed his own sister. Loomis screams "No!" repeatedly and attempts to shoot Jamie, but Meeker stops him. Loomis sinks to the floor and begins sobbing, as Rachel, Richard, and Meeker stare in horror, realizing that the evil inside of Michael has now influenced Jamie.

Cast

Production

Development

After Halloween III: Season of the Witch, executive producer Moustapha Akkad wanted to move further with the series, and bring back Michael Myers. Producer Paul Freeman, a friend of Akkad with a long list of credits to his name, explained to Fangoria magazine in 1988 that everybody came out of Halloween III saying, "Where's Michael?" John Carpenter was approached by Cannon Films, who had just finished 1986's release of The Texas Chainsaw Massacre 2, to write and direct Halloween 4. Debra Hill planned to produce the film, while Carpenter teamed up with Dennis Etchison who, under the pseudonym Jack Martin, had written novelizations of both Halloween II (1981) and Halloween III: Season of the Witch (1982) to write a script to Halloween 4. Originally, Joe Dante was Carpenter's choice in mind of director for the project.

However, Akkad rejected the Etchison script, calling it "too cerebral" and insisting that any new Halloween sequel must feature Myers as a flesh and blood killer. In an interview, Etchison explained how he received the phone call informing him of the rejection of his script. Etchison said, "I received a call from Debra Hill and she said, 'Dennis, I just wanted you to know that John and I have sold our interest in the title 'Halloween' and unfortunately, your script was not part of the deal."

Carpenter and Hill had signed all of their rights away to Akkad, who gained ownership. Akkad said, "I just went back to the basics of Halloween on Halloween 4 and it was the most 
successful." As Carpenter refused to continue his involvement with the series, a new director was sought out. Dwight H. Little, a native of Ohio, replaced Carpenter. Little had previously directed episodes for Freddy's Nightmares and the film Getting Even.

Screenplay
On February 25, 1988, writer Alan B. McElroy, a native of Cleveland, Ohio, was brought in to write the script for Halloween 4. The writer's strike was to begin on March 7 that year. This forced McElroy to develop a concept, pitch the story, and send in the final draft in under eleven days. McElroy came up with the idea of Brittany "Britti" Lloyd, Laurie Strode's daughter, to be chased by her uncle, who has escaped from Ridgemont after being in a coma for ten years. Dr. Samuel Loomis goes looking for Michael with Sheriff Meeker. The setting of the place was once again Haddonfield, Illinois. The character of Laurie Strode was revealed to have died, leaving Britti with the Carruthers family, which included Rachel, the family's seventeen-year-old daughter. Britti's name was later changed to Jamie, a homage to Laurie Strode actress Jamie Lee Curtis.

McElroy told Fangoria:

In the original draft, Sheriff Ben Meeker was to be killed during the Shape's attack on the Meeker house. A fire would have started in the basement and burnt down the entire house. The scene on top of the roof with the Shape, Rachel, and Jamie was supposed to be engulfed in flames. This idea was scrapped due to budget issues. Instead, a more "soap opera" feel was incorporated, which included a love triangle subplot between Rachel, Brady, and Kelly Meeker, the sheriff's daughter.

Director Dwight H. Little stated in 2006 that his interpretation of McElroy's screenplay had the Michael Myers character played as a literal escaped mental patient, not a supernatural figure. Little approached the screenplay as though Myers was pursuing Jamie as a means of "connecting with her", but that he had no social capacity to interact with her, and thus resorted to violence. The screenplay references the events of Halloween II (1981), in which a fire breaks out in Haddonfield Hospital, by having both Myers and Loomis display burn scars on their respective hands and faces.

Casting
The cast of Halloween 4 included only one actor from the first two films, Donald Pleasence, who reprised his role as Samuel Loomis, Michael Myers' psychiatrist. According to Little, Pleasence was "committed conceptually" to the role, but did not sign on to the project until having read a finished screenplay. Before McElroy's script was chosen, the producers asked Jamie Lee Curtis, another original cast member, to reprise her role as Laurie Strode, the original's heroine. Curtis had become a success in the film industry and had established a career with her roles in films like Trading Places (1983) and A Fish Called Wanda (1988). Curtis declined and did not want to continue her participation in the film, although she did return for the seventh Halloween film. As a result, her character was written out and died, which is briefly explained in the film.

The script introduced Laurie Strode's seven-year-old daughter, Jamie Lloyd. Melissa Joan Hart had auditioned for the role, among various other girls. Up against her was Danielle Harris, who had previously starred in One Life to Live as Samantha Garretson; Harris was ultimately cast in the role after auditioning in New York. Rebecca Schaeffer had auditioned for the role of Rachel Carruthers, but had to drop out due to scheduling conflicts. Twenty-three-year-old Ellie Cornell had also auditioned. Cornell had chosen to audition for Halloween 4 and A Nightmare on Elm Street 4: The Dream Master (1988) as the role of Kristen Parker. Cornell chose Halloween 4 and successfully landed the role of Rachel. Beau Starr was cast as the new Sheriff, Ben Meeker, replacing Sheriff Lee Brackett (Charles Cyphers), and Kathleen Kinmont was cast as the Sheriff's daughter, Kelly. George P. Wilbur was cast to play Michael Myers.

Filming
Principal photography began on April 11, 1988. Instead of filming in Pasadena, California (the original filming location and stand in for Haddonfield) due to high-rising costs, filming took place in and around Salt Lake City, Utah. As filming was taking place in March, during springtime, the producers were forced to import leaves and big squash, which they would use to create pumpkins by painting them orange. "One of the obvious challenges in making a part four of anything is to interest a contemporary audience in old characters and themes," said director Dwight H. Little. "What I'm trying to do is capture the mood of the original Halloween and yet take a lot of new chances. What we're attempting to do is walk a fine line between horror and mystery. Halloween 4 will not be an ax-in-the-forehead kind of movie." Paul Freeman agreed. "This film does contain some humorous moments, but it's not of the spoof or send-up variety. It's humor that rises out of the film's situations and quickly turns back into terror."

George P. Wilbur, who was cast as Michael Myers, wore hockey pads under the costume to make himself look more physically imposing, and he was often filmed in mirror reflections or off-center so that the audience could witness him "in pieces" rather than have an encompassing view. During filming, the cast and crew made it a point to take it easy on Danielle Harris, as she was only a young child at the time, and made sure that she was not scared too badly and knew that none of it was real; to this end, Wilbur regularly removed the mask in front of her in order to remind her that it was just a movie and he was not going to hurt her.

The late night scenes caused issues with the cast. Garlan Wilde, a gaffer for the film, was injured during the scene between Brady and the Shape when he dropped a light and accidentally slit his wrists. He was rushed to the hospital. In addition, while filming the rooftop scene, Ellie Cornell cut her stomach open on a large nail while sliding down the roof, though she continued filming the scene despite losing a sizable amount of blood. During most of the night scenes, Donald Pleasence became so cold that he wore a hat for most of the scenes, unbeknownst to the crew. This caused over six hours of footage to be re-shot. The shoot lasted about 41 days and Ellie Cornell and Danielle Harris were required to be on set for 36 of those days.

During filming, it was considered that the customized 1975 Captain Kirk mask be reused for this film. However, the mask was long gone and a new one was purchased from a local costume shop. The producers wanted to test and see what it would look like without the edits. The school scene was filmed and when reviewing the producers did not like how the mask turned out. It was allegedly customized again but did not live up to the original, and the producers felt it was too old and went for a new mask. Some scenes had to be re-shot with the new mask. The only scene left in is when Loomis is thrown through a glass door; as Michael comes up behind him, the unaltered face and blonde hair is visible.

An article on screenrant.com says:

After viewing the film's rough cut, director Dwight H. Little and producer Moustapha Akkad decided that the film's violence was too soft, and so an extra day of "blood filming" commenced. Special effects make-up artist John Carl Buechler (director of Friday the 13th Part VII: The New Blood) was brought in to create the thumb in the forehead kill and neck-twisting of the redneck seen in the film's final cut.

Music

The score was performed by Alan Howarth, who had assisted John Carpenter on Halloween II and Halloween III. Howarth gained approval from Dwight H. Little before he could accept the offer, creating a new score that referenced the original's but with a synthesizer twist. Howarth also included new tracks such as "Jamie's Nightmare", "Return of the Shape", and "Police Station". The soundtrack was released to Compact Disc, LP Vinyl Record, and Cassette Tape on September 28, 1988.

Release
Halloween 4 opened in 1,679 theaters on October 21, 1988 and grossed $6,831,250 in its opening weekend, ranking number one at the box office. It held the top spot in its second weekend, and achieved a total domestic gross of $17,768,757 in the United States, becoming the sixth best performing film in the Halloween series.

Reception
The film garnered a negative critical reception upon release. It currently has a 33% rating on Rotten Tomatoes based on 30 reviews, with an average rating of 4.1 out of 10. The site's critical consensus reads, "Halloween 4: The Return Of Michael Myers may bring the series' masked killer back into the fold, but fails to offer the visceral scares and inventiveness of the original." On Metacritic it has a score of 34 out of 100 based on reviews from 10 critics, which indicates "generally unfavorable reviews".

Caryn James of The New York Times criticized the film for abandoning the original film's strengths saying "suspense and psychological horror have given way to superhuman strength and resilience." Variety found the film to be "a no-frills, workmanlike picture." Richard Harrington  of The Washington Post declared the film "very much the cheap knockoff of its prototype, but not half as visceral." Kim Newman for Empire said "It's incredible that a film could be so closely patterned on Carpenter's still-thrilling original movie and yet be so stupid, unscary and plodding as Halloween 4 is."

However, the film received a more positive reception from later reviews. JoBlo.com said, "The movie is tight, has good murders and a kicked my butt ending. The Shape is back and in good form; this is my favorite Halloween next to the first one." IGN declared "Halloween 4: The Return of Michael Myers stands out as the second best film in the entire series." Dread Central said, "Halloween 4 is a strong sequel, horror film and Halloween movie." DVD Talk said "Despite its flaws, Halloween 4 is one of the best slashers from the late 1980s, standing out in an era when the subgenre was in steep decline."

Home media
The film was first released on VHS in May 1989 as a rental title by CBS/FOX home entertainment. It was made available for sell-through in October 1989 to coincide with the theatrical release of Halloween 5: The Revenge of Michael Myers. In 2006, Anchor Bay Entertainment released special editions of this film and its sequel on DVD. Supplements include the Halloween 4/5 panel at the "Return to Haddonfield" convention in 2003, a documentary titled "Halloween 4 Final Cut", a commentary with Danielle Harris and Ellie Cornell, another commentary by Alan B. McElroy and Anthony Masi and the film's theatrical trailer. Halloween 4, Halloween 5, a Blu-ray, standard DVD and extended edition of Halloween and the documentary Halloween: 25 Years of Terror were released together with a replica Michael Myers mask in a limited edition 30th anniversary box set of the first film. The film was released on Blu-ray in Germany on May 4, 2012, and in the US on August 21, 2012.

In the United Kingdom, Halloween 4 was originally released on VHS format by Braveworld in the early 1990s, and then, Legend distribution. On June 17, 2002, Digital Entertainment released the film on VHS, while a second version from the company containing a "Widescreen Presentation" was released on September 5, 2002. Anchor Bay Entertainment released the film for the first time on DVD in a "Special Edition" on January 28, 2002, while Digital Entertainment released the film several months later on September 5, 2002 to coincide with their newest VHS release. Hollywood released the film individually on October 27, 2003, and released a set containing the film with Ulli Lommel's The Boogeyman, Boogeyman II, and Halloween 5: The Revenge of Michael Myers. Hollywood also released a double feature containing the film alongside Mario Bava's A Bay of Blood. Anchor Bay then acquired rights to all subsequent home video releases, and released Halloween 4 with the 1986 film House in another double feature on February 6, 2006. Anchor Bay re-issued the DVD on October 11, 2010, which features the theatrical trailer and the featurette, "Inside Halloween 4". Anchor Bay released the film again as part of a DVD set, which contains the first five films in the franchise, on October 15, 2012. This release contains new special features: audio commentary with actors Ellie Cornell and Danielle Harris, audio commentary with director Dwight H. Little and author Justin Beahm, Halloween 4/5 discussion panel, and theatrical trailer. Shout! Factory also released the first ten films on Blu-ray in a limited edition box set in addition to Halloween 4 on Ultra HD Blu-ray under the Scream Factory label.

The film was also released on Blu-ray in Australia on October 2, 2013.

Novelization
To tie in with the film's release, a novelization by Nicholas Grabowsky was published, containing 224 pages. The novel closely follows the film's events, with a few alterations. In 2003, the novel was re-issued with new material and cover art, titled Halloween IV: The Special Limited Edition.

References

Works cited

External links

 
 
 
 
 
 

1988 films
1988 horror films
American slasher films
1988 independent films
1980s slasher films
American independent films
1980s English-language films
Films set in 1988
Films set in Illinois
Films shot in Salt Lake City
4
American sequel films
Alternative sequel films
Films directed by Dwight H. Little
Films scored by Alan Howarth (composer)
Films about orphans
American serial killer films
Films about children
1980s American films